Virginia Village may refer to:
Virginia Village, Denver, a neighborhood of Denver, Colorado
Virginia Village, Florida, a community in Clay County, Florida

See also
Village, Virginia